Jordan Chipangama (born 12 November 1988) is a Zambian long distance runner who specialises in the marathon. He competed in the men's marathon event at the 2016 Summer Olympics where he finished in 93rd place with a time of 2:24:58. Chipangama attended college in the United States. In college, he competed for Central Arizona College and Northern Arizona University.

References

External links
 

1988 births
Living people
Zambian male long-distance runners
Zambian male marathon runners
Sportspeople from Lusaka
Athletes (track and field) at the 2016 Summer Olympics
Olympic athletes of Zambia